Georgy Vitalyevich Yevtyukhin (also romanized as Georgy Evtyukhin, Georgi Yevtyukhin; born 9 May 1970) is a Russian former professional ice hockey centre. Yevtyukhin spent the majority of his career playing in the Soviet Hockey League and the Russian Superleague for HC Spartak Moscow. He competed in the men's tournament at the 1994 Winter Olympics. He was an assistant coach to SKIF Nizhny Novgorod of the Russian Women's Hockey League during the 2007–08 season and served as the team‘s head coach for the first part of 2008–09 but was replaced mid-season by Yevgeni Bobariko.

Career statistics

Regular season and playoffs

International

References

External links

1970 births
Living people
Russian ice hockey centres
Ice hockey people from Moscow
HC Spartak Moscow players
Metallurg Novokuznetsk players
Nippon Paper Cranes players
Eisbären Berlin players
HC Mechel players
Ice hockey players at the 1994 Winter Olympics
Olympic ice hockey players of Russia